Ann Buchanan is a make-up artist.

She was nominated for an Academy Award at the 73rd Academy Awards for her work on the film Shadow of the Vampire. Her nomination was shared with Amber Sibley.

References

Year of birth missing (living people)
Living people
Make-up artists